The Estonian Red is an Estonian breed of dairy cattle. It was developed in the second half of the nineteenth century from cross-breeding of local cattle with imported stock of the Angeln, Danish Red and North Slesvig Red breeds. The coat is red, but sometimes it varies from red-white to brown and rarely black.

Its conservation status was not listed by the FAO in 2007; in 2021 it was reported to DAD-IS as "endangered". It is one of the constituent breeds of the European Red Dairy Breed.

References 

Red cattle
Cattle breeds
Cattle breeds originating in Estonia